Sunni Ali, also known as Si Ali, Sunni Ali Ber (Ber meaning "the Great"),  was born in Ali Kolon. He reigned from about 1464 to 1492.  Sunni Ali was the first king of the Songhai Empire, located in Africa and the 15th ruler of the Sunni dynasty. Under Sunni Ali's command, many cities were captured and then fortified, such as Timbuktu (captured in 1468) and Djenné (captured in 1475). Sunni conducted a repressive policy against the scholars of Timbuktu, especially those of the Sankore region who were associated with the Tuareg whom Ali expelled to gain control of the town.

Sunni Ali organized a fleet to the Niger river. During his reign, Songhai surpassed the height of the Mali Empire, engulfing areas under the Mali Empire (and the Ghana Empire before it). His death, on November 6, 1492, is a matter of conjecture. According to the Tarikh al-Sudan, Ali drowned while crossing the Niger River. Oral tradition believes he was killed by his sister's son, Askia Muhammad Ture. He was succeeded by his son, Sunni Baru, who was challenged by Askia because Baru was not seen as a faithful Muslim. Askia succeeded to the throne. According to the Tarikh al-Sudan it is believed that this action caused Sonni Ali's daughters to shout out "A si kiya!" a more modern phrasing would be “A si tiya” or (he shall not be it), at the news of this take over.

Sunni Ali ruled over both urban Muslims and rural non-Muslims at a time when the traditional co-existence of different beliefs was being challenged. His adherence to African animism while also professing Islam leads some writers to describe him as outwardly or nominally Muslim.

References

External links
 Kingdoms of the Medieval Sudan - Xavier University
 Ancient African Legends
 Early African Empires and their Global Connections
 Mythinglinks

Year of birth missing
1492 deaths
People of the Songhai Empire
15th-century Muslims
History of Mali
Deaths by horse-riding accident
15th-century monarchs in Africa